The curling competition of the 2010 Olympics was held at Vancouver Olympic/Paralympic Centre in Vancouver. It is the fifth time that curling was on the Olympic program, after having been staged in 1924, 1998, 2002 and 2006. For the 2010 Winter Olympics the competition followed the same format that was used during the 2006 Turin Winter Olympics, with 10 teams playing a round robin tournament, from which the top four teams advance to the semi-finals.

The women's competition concluded on Friday, February 26, 2010. In the bronze medal match, the Chinese team made history by becoming the first team from Asia to win an Olympic curling medal. The gold medal match was one of the closest medal games in Olympic competition. Team Canada won the silver medal, their best performance since the 1998 Nagano Olympic Games when Sandra Schmirler skipped the Canadians to gold. Team Sweden won the gold medal. Anette Norberg, Eva Lund, Cathrine Lindahl, and Anna Le Moine (née Anna Bergström [Anna Svärd in Torino]) became the first curlers to win two gold medals at the Olympic Games.

The men's competition concluded on Saturday, February 27, 2010. In the bronze medal match, Markus Eggler of Switzerland became the first male curler to win two Olympic medals. The gold medal final was a rematch between Canada and Norway of the 2002 Olympics men's final (although only one athlete from each team participated in both finals). The only disturbance was when an unsportsmanlike spectator deliberately blew a horn while the Norwegians were delivering their stones. The crowd promptly booed the man and the horn was not blown again until the medal ceremony. The Canadians controlled the game throughout and never relinquished the lead. Torger Nergård and Kevin Martin became the second and third men to win two Olympic medals.

With the conclusion of the Vancouver Olympic curling tournament, eight athletes now have two Olympic curling medals. They are in the order in which they received their medals: Mirjam Ott (SUI), Markus Eggler (SUI), Kevin Martin (CAN), Torger Nergård (NOR), Anette Norberg, Eva Lund, Cathrine Lindahl, and Anna Le Moine, all of Sweden.

Medal summary

Medal table

Events

Qualified teams

Men's

*Throws third rocks
**Throws second rocks

Women's

*Throws second rocks

**The World Curling Federation had Olga Jarkova listed as the Third. However, a press release by the Vancouver Organizing Committee has Anna Sidorova listed as Third.

***On Feb 21, 2010, Debbie McCormick switched to throwing third, with Allison Pottinger throwing fourth.

Qualification
Performances at the 2007, 2008 and 2009 World Curling Championships decided which countries were able to send curling teams to the 2010 Olympics. Points were distributed in the following manner, with the top 9 teams (excluding - Canada) qualifying for the Olympics.

In case of a tie during the 2007 World championships, the points were split (for example, if two teams tied for tenth place, they would receive 2.5 points). For the 2008 and 2009 championships, such ties were broken according to head-to-head matchups, and if necessary, by the draw shot challenge.  Canada, as the host nation, qualified automatically.  Scotland's points counted as Great Britain (Scotland does not compete at the Olympic level separately).

Men's standings

*Scotland, England and Wales all compete separately in international curling. By an agreement between the curling federations of those three home nations, only Scotland can score Olympic qualification points for Great Britain.

Women's standings

*Scotland, England and Wales all compete separately in international curling. By an agreement between the curling federations of those three home nations, only Scotland can score Olympic qualification points for Great Britain.

Olympic curling trials
 2009 Canadian Olympic Curling Trials
 2010 United States Olympic Curling Trials
 2009 Swiss Olympic Curling Trials

Men's tournament

Women's tournament

See also
Wheelchair curling at the 2010 Winter Paralympics

References

External links
Vancouver 2010 official website 
World Curling Federation's official website
Olympic Games Qualification standings
Qualification System
Olympic Curling Competition Draw Schedule
 AP Winter Games Video Essay: The Mysteries of Curling
AP Winter Games: Curling

 
2010 in Canadian curling
Winter Olympics
2010 Winter Olympics events
2010
Curling in British Columbia
International curling competitions hosted by Canada